South Tyrolean Freedom (STF) is a regionalist, separatist and national-conservative political party in South Tyrol, Italy. The party, which is part of the South Tyrolean independence movement, seeks to represent the German-speaking population and proposes the secession of South Tyrol from Italy and its reunification with the State of Tyrol within Austria. Its founding leader was Eva Klotz.

History

The South Tyrolean Freedom emerged as a split from the Union for South Tyrol (UfS) in May 2007. On 8 June 2007 it was notarially founded in Brixen. The founding members were Herbert Campidell, Eva Klotz, Sven Knoll, Reinhold Ladurner, Roland Lang, Sepp Mitterhofer, Werner Thaler and Dietmar Zwerger.

In mid 2007, the party presented a provocative poster campaign with the slogan  ("South Tyrol is not Italy") and the Austrian flag as background. A sign with the same content was also set up at the Brenner Pass border, in June 2008.

In April 2009, the STF became a full member of the European Free Alliance, a pan-European organization of regionalist parties. Gudrun Kofler from the STF Youth (Junge Süd-Tiroler Freiheit) was elected as Vice President of the EFA Youth.

In January 2012, it was reported that the party had reached 2,800 members, a lot more than UfS in its best days.

In the 2013 provincial election, the STF won 7.2%, its record high so far, resulting  in three provincial councillors.

In November 2014 Klotz, who had served in the Provincial Council for 31 consecutive years (for SH, UfS and STF), announced her resignation from the assembly in order to take care of her husband, who was severely ill.

In the 2018 provincial election, the party obtained 6.0% of the vote and two provincial councillors.

In the municipal elections in September 2020, South Tyrolean Freedom competed in 29 South Tyrolean municipalities with 140 candidates. It was able to increase its seats from 41 to 49.

Ideology
The STF sees itself as a "liberal-patriotic" party aimed at protecting the German-speaking population of South Tyrol. The party claims South Tyroleans' right to self-determination and to conduct a referendum in order to decide whether they want to be part of Italy or the Austrian state of Tyrol. The party programme also emphasizes the protection of the environment, the defense of family values, a moderately liberal economic policy and the concept of Europe of the regions.

Election results

Provincial Council

Leadership
Spokesperson / Legal Representative: Werner Thaler (2007–present)

References

External links
Official website

Political parties in South Tyrol
Separatism in Italy
Secessionist organizations in Europe
German irredentism
German nationalist political parties
Political parties established in 2007
European Free Alliance
Political parties of minorities
South Tyrolean nationalism
National conservative parties
Right-wing populist parties
Right-wing populism in Italy